Marino Bifulco (born 9 August 1982) is an Italian goalkeeper who currently plays for Real Giulianova in the Italian Serie D.

References

1982 births
Living people
Sportspeople from Pescara
Footballers from Abruzzo
Italian footballers
Association football goalkeepers
S.S. Chieti Calcio players
Matera Calcio players
S.S. Monopoli 1966 players
S.S. Teramo Calcio players
Serie C players
Serie D players